A list of the most notable films produced in the Cinema of Austria, ordered by year and split by decade of release.

For an alphabetical list of articles on Austrian films see :Category:Austrian films.

Austrian films to 1919
List of Austrian films of the 1920s
List of Austrian films of the 1930s
List of Austrian films of the 1940s
List of Austrian films of the 1950s
List of Austrian films of the 1960s
List of Austrian films of the 1970s
List of Austrian films of the 1980s
List of Austrian films of the 1990s
List of Austrian films of the 2000s
List of Austrian films of the 2010s
List of Austrian films of the 2020s

External links
Austrian Film Commission